The Arizona Sun Corridor, shortened Sun Corridor, is a megaregion, or megapolitan area, in the southern area of the U.S. state of Arizona. The Sun Corridor is comparable to Indiana in both size and population. It is one of the fastest growing conurbations in the country and is speculated to double its population by 2040. The largest metropolitan areas are the Phoenix metropolitan area – Valley of the Sun, and the Tucson metropolitan area – The Old Pueblo. The regions' populace is nestled in the valley of a desert environment. Similar to Southern California, the urban area extends into Mexico, reaching the communities of Nogales and Agua Prieta.

Its population is composed of five metropolitan areas: Phoenix, Tucson, Prescott, Sierra Vista-Douglas and Nogales. Of these, two are metropolitan areas with over 1,000,000 residents: the Phoenix metropolitan area with 4.85 million residents and the Tucson metropolitan area with over 1 million residents. The Arizona Sun Corridor is made up of all of Maricopa, Pinal and Pima counties, along with parts of Yavapai, Santa Cruz and Cochise counties.  It is home to over 86 percent of Arizona's population.

Most of the Arizona Sun Corridor is in the Sonoran Desert. To the south of the region is the border between the United States and Mexico, and to the north and east is the Arizona transition zone and the Mountains of Arizona. The Southern California Megaregion is to the west and is the nearest other Megaregion to the Arizona Sun Corridor.

Extent

The Arizona Sun Corridor lies in the American Southwest, about halfway between the Southern California and Front Range Megaregions. It is shown on the map in deep blue.

Below is a table listing all communities of the Arizona Sun Corridor with a population of at least 10,000 residents.

Transportation

Road
Intercity in the region is provided by the I-8, I-10, I-17, and I-19 freeways, as well as US 60, SR 87, SR 90, and SR 77, among other surface highways.

Phoenix area arterials are set up in a grid pattern, which helps simplify transportation within the region. Tucson's streets have a similar system.

Rail
Amtrak's Sunset Limited operates three times a week, connecting Maricopa, Arizona and Tucson. There is no other intercity rail in the region; however a high-speed rail corridor is also being studied between Phoenix and Tucson.

Intracity rail systems include the Valley Metro Rail, which operates within the Phoenix metropolitan area, connecting Uptown and Downtown Phoenix with Tempe and Mesa, and Tucson's Sun Link streetcar system, which links Downtown Tucson and the Mercado district to the University of Arizona.

Air
Phoenix Sky Harbor International Airport and Tucson International Airport provide air transportation to the region, from both within the country and from a few foreign countries, among other smaller airports, which focus on regional air traffic from nearby.  Recently, Phoenix-Mesa Gateway Airport, previously being a military base, has also become an option for low-cost carriers to fly into the Phoenix area as well.

US Airways, now owned by Fort Worth company American Airlines, was once headquartered and based in Tempe after a reverse-merger from America West Airlines in 2005, headquarters of which is in the Phoenix Valley. However, American Airlines maintains a strong presence in the state due to the history with US Airways.

References

Geography of Arizona
Regions of Arizona
Megapolitan areas of the United States